Francesco Stocco was the third of four s built for the Italian  (Royal Navy) in the 1910s.

Design

They had a crew of 98 officers and enlisted men. The ships were powered by two steam turbines, with steam provided by four Thornycroft water-tube boilers.

Franco Stocco was armed with a main battery of six  guns. Her light armament consisted of a pair of  anti-aircraft guns and two  machine guns. She was also equipped with four  torpedo tubes in two twin launchers, one on each side of the ship. The ship also carried ten naval mines.

Service history
Francesco Stocco was built at the  shipyard in Sestri Ponente, and was launched on 5 June 1917.

After the Italian surrender to the Allies on 3 September 1943, German forces launched a major attack against their erstwhile ally. Francesco Stocco was attacked and sunk by German bombers on 24 September while cruising off Corfu.

Notes

References
 
 

 
 

 
World War I naval ships of Italy
Ships built in Italy
Ships built by Cantieri navali Odero
1917 ships
World War II torpedo boats of Italy
Maritime incidents in September 1943
Ships sunk by German aircraft
Destroyers sunk by aircraft